Annikka Mutanen (born 13 April 1965) is a Finnish judoka. She competed in the women's extra-lightweight event at the 1992 Summer Olympics.

References

External links
 

1965 births
Living people
Finnish female judoka
Olympic judoka of Finland
Judoka at the 1992 Summer Olympics
People from Polvijärvi
Sportspeople from North Karelia